Irene Schuch (born 20 November 1935) is a German athlete. She competed in the women's discus throw at the 1960 Summer Olympics.

References

External links
 

1935 births
Living people
Athletes (track and field) at the 1960 Summer Olympics
German female discus throwers
Olympic athletes of the United Team of Germany
Place of birth missing (living people)